Dr A.G.M's City School is a senior secondary school situated in the Pahru crossing Nowgaam area of Srinagar, Jammu and Kashmir (J&K), India. Its foundation stone was laid in 1993 in the Sanat Nagar area of Srinagar, but the school changed its location in 2004–2005 to Nowgaam. The school celebrated its first decade of operation in 2003 with more than 2,000 students in attendance. Originally, the school only had primary classes but in 2007, due to its growing popularity in Srinagar, it was upgraded to senior secondary level.

The Chairman of the School is Dr. Abdul Gani Madhosh who is a prominent retired scholar & academician of Srinagar. The School is administered by his son Mohammad Usman and the vice principal Ms Neesha. The school has permanent recognition from the J&K State Board of School Education as well as the J&K Government Education Department.

School houses 
The school has four houses;
 Neil Nag: red
 Kausar Nag: green
 Shesh Nag : yellow
 Veri Nag : blue

References 

Schools in Srinagar
High schools and secondary schools in Jammu and Kashmir